Microsoft services may refer to:

 Microsoft mobile services, the services Microsoft provides on the mobile platform.
 Microsoft Online Services, the services Microsoft provides on the web platform.
 Microsoft Analysis Services
 Microsoft Services Asia

See also

Windows Live
List of Microsoft software
List of Microsoft Windows components